Aguinaldo Policarpo Mendes da Veiga (born 25 March 1989), simply known as Aguinaldo, is an Angolan-Portuguese professional footballer who plays as a forward for Bahraini Premier League club Al-Najma SC and the Angola national football team. Aguinaldo has played for thirteen clubs in three continents and seven countries.

Club career

Bizertin
Tunisian championship competitors CA Bizertin gave Aguinaldo a two-season long contract back in 2013.

Surprised by rumors circulating that he allegedly received some money from G.D. Interclube prior to leaving for Tunisia in 2014, the athlete denied such claims, stating that he had given it all back and that there is nothing they can do because he is not an Interclube player. He became a free agent when his contract with Recreativo do Libolo expired, before going to Tunisia.

Doxa Katokopias
In January 2016, Aguinaldo joined Greek club Doxa Katokopias FC. He later chose the number 89 jersey.

Sabah
On 15 May 2019, Aguinaldo signed by Malaysian Premier League club Sabah FA as one of two imports to fill their vacant player slots. Aguinaldo scored the winning goal for Sabah to seal their first place in the 2019 Malaysia Premier League table during the match against UiTM F.C. since the team last lifted the old first division title back in 1996, subsequently making the team able to qualify to the 2020 Malaysia Super League.

Honours

Club
Recreativo do Libolo
Girabola: 2011
Sabah FC
Liga Premier Malaysia: 2019

References

External links
 
 

1989 births
Portuguese sportspeople of Angolan descent
People from Luanda
Living people
Angolan footballers
Angola international footballers
Portuguese footballers
Association football forwards
G.D. Tourizense players
C.D. Tondela players
C.R.D. Libolo players
AEP Paphos FC players
CA Bizertin players
Mesaimeer SC players
G.D. Interclube players
Doxa Katokopias FC players
AEL Limassol players
Gil Vicente F.C. players
Ubon United F.C. players
Sabah F.C. (Malaysia) players
FC Metaloglobus București players
Al-Najma SC (Bahrain) players
Girabola players
Cypriot First Division players
Tunisian Ligue Professionnelle 1 players
Liga Portugal 2 players
Qatari Second Division players
Malaysia Super League players
Liga II players
Bahraini Premier League players
Angolan expatriate footballers
Expatriate footballers in Cyprus
Expatriate footballers in Portugal
Expatriate footballers in Tunisia
Expatriate footballers in Thailand
Expatriate footballers in Qatar
Expatriate footballers in Malaysia
Expatriate footballers in Romania
Expatriate footballers in Bahrain